Medal of the Red Cross or Red Cross Medal may refer to:
 Medal of the Red Cross (Netherlands)
 German Red Cross Decoration
 Red Cross Medal (Oldenburg)
 Red Cross Medal (Prussia)
 Royal Red Cross, United Kingdom
Portuguese Red Cross Decorations
Red Cross Medal of Merit (Serbia)
Order of the Red Cross (Serbia)